The Horgo is a volcano in the Taryatu-Chulutu volcanic field in the Tariat district in the Arkhangai Province of Mongolia. The Horgo lies east of the lake Terkhiin Tsagaan Nuur and together they are the core of the Khorgo-Terkhiin Tsagaan Nuur National Park. A notable geological feature are solidified lava bubbles, which the locals have named "basalt yurts".

References

Volcanoes of Mongolia